The 16th Cinema Eye Honors recognized outstanding artistry and craft in nonfiction filmmaking of 2022 and took place at the Museum of the Moving Image in Astoria, New York on January 12, 2023.

The broadcasts category nominees as well as the recipient for the Legacy Award, given to the 1995 film Crumb, were announced on October 20, 2022. The Unforgettables and the Audience Choice Prize longlist were presented on October 25, 2022, while the nominations for the feature film categories were announced on November 10, 2022. 

National Geographic films Fire of Love and The Territory led the nominations with seven each, becoming the films with the most nominations in a year in the history of the awards. In the broadcast nominations, HBO film Four Hours at the Capitol led with three.

All That Breathes received the Outstanding Non-Fiction Feature while Fire of Love received the most awards with four wins, including three competitive awards plus The Unforgettables Award.

Winners and nominees
The winners are listed first and in bold.

Feature film
{| class="wikitable" style="width:95%"
|- 
! width="50%" | Outstanding Non-Fiction Feature
! width="50%" | Outstanding Direction
|-
|valign="top"|
 ''All That Breathes – Directed and Produced by Shaunak Sen; Produced by Aman Mann and Teddy Leifer All the Beauty and the Bloodshed – Directed and Produced by Laura Poitras; Produced by Howard Gertler, John Lyons, Nan Goldin and Yoni Golijov
 Fire of Love – Directed and Produced by Sara Dosa; Produced by Shane Boris and Ina Fichman
 Navalny – Directed by Daniel Roher; Produced by Odessa Rae, Diane Becker, Melanie Miller and Shane Boris
 A Night of Knowing Nothing – Directed by Payal Kapadia; Produced by Thomas Hakim, Julien Graff and Ranabir Das
 The Territory – Directed and Produced by Alex Pritz; Produced by Darren Aronofsky, Gabriel Uchida, Sigrid Dyekjær, Lizzie Gillett and Will N. Miller
|valign="top"|
 All the Beauty and the Bloodshed – Laura Poitras All That Breathes – Shaunak Sen
 Beba – Rebeca Huntt
 Descendant – Margaret Brown
 Fire of Love – Sara Dosa
 A Night of Knowing Nothing – Payal Kapadia
|-
! width="50%" | Outstanding Editing
! width="50%" | Outstanding Production
|-
|valign="top"|
 Fire of Love – Erin Casper and Jocelyne Chaput All the Beauty and the Bloodshed – Amy Foote, Joe Bini and Brian A. Kates
 Moonage Daydream – Brett Morgen
 Riotsville, USA – Nels Bangerter
 Three Minutes: A Lengthening – Katharina Wartena
|valign="top"|
 Navalny – Odessa Rae, Diane Becker, Melanie Miller and Shane Boris All That Breathes – Aman Mann, Shaunak Sen and Teddy Leifer
 A House Made of Splinters – Monica Hellström
 In Her Hands – Juan Camilo Cruz and Jonathan Schaerf
 The Territory – Alex Pritz, Darren Aronofsky, Gabriel Uchida, Sigrid Dyekjær, Lizzie Gillett and Will N. Miller
|-
! width="50%" | Outstanding Cinematography
! width="50%" | Outstanding Original Score
|-
|valign="top"|
 All That Breathes – Ben Bernhard Cow – Magda Kowalczyk
 A House Made of Splinters – Simon Lereng Wilmont
 A Night of Knowing Nothing – Ranabir Das
 The Territory – Alex Pritz and Tangãi Uru-eu-wau-wau
 Users – Bennett Cerf
|valign="top"|
 Fire of Love – Nicolas Godin All the Beauty and the Bloodshed – Soundwalk Collective
 Descendant – Ray Angry, Rhiannon Giddens and Dirk Powell
 Nothing Compares – Linda Buckley and Irene Buckley
 The Territory – Katya Mihailova
 Users – Dave Cerf
|-
! width="50%" | Outstanding Sound Design
! width="50%" | Outstanding Visual Design
|-
|valign="top"|
 Moonage Daydream – Samir Foco, John Warhurst and Nina Hartstone All That Breathes – Niladri Shekhar Roy and Susmit "Bob" Nath
 Fire of Love – Patrice LeBlanc and Gavin Fernandes
 I Didn't See You There – Tom Paul and Andrés E. Marthe González
 The Territory – Rune Klausen and Peter Albrechtsen
|valign="top"|
 Moonage Daydream – Stefan Nadelman Fire of Love – Lucy Munger, Kara Blake and Rui Ting Ji Dear Mr. Brody – Gary Walker, John Mark Lapham and Sam Klatt
 Louis Armstrong's Black & Blues – Hectah Arias
 My Old School – Rory Lowe and Scott Morriss
|-
! width="50%" | Outstanding Debut
! width="50%" | Outstanding Non-Fiction Short
|-
|valign="top"|
 The Territory – Directed by Alex Pritz Bad Axe – Directed by David Siev
 Beba – Directed by Rebeca Huntt
 I Didn't See You There – Directed by Reid Davenport
 A Night of Knowing Nothing – Directed by Payal Kapadia
 Nothing Compares – Directed by Kathryn Ferguson
|valign="top"|
 Nuisance Bear – Directed by Jack Weisman and Gabriela Osio Vanden In Flow of Words – Directed by Eliane Esther Bots
 Last Days of August – Directed by Rodrigo Ojeda-Beck and Robert Machoian
 Long Line of Ladies – Directed by Rayka Zehtabchi and Shaandiin Tome
 The Martha Mitchell Effect – Directed by Anne Alvergue and Debra McClutchy
 Shut Up and Paint – Directed by Alex Mallis and Titus Kaphar
|-
! width="50%" | Spotlight Award
! width="50%" | Heterodox Award
|-
|valign="top"|
 Master of Light – Directed by Rosa Ruth Boesten After Sherman – Directed by Jon-Sesrie Goff
 Brotherhood – Directed by Francesco Montagner
 Hidden Letters – Directed by Violet Du Feng and Zhao Qing
 Into the Ice – Directed by Lars Henrik Ostenfeld
|valign="top"|
 Aftersun – Directed by Charlotte Wells Dry Ground Burning – Directed by Joana Pimenta and Adirley Queirós
 Dos Estaciones – Directed by Juan Pablo González
 Marcel the Shell with Shoes On – Directed by Dean Fleischer-Camp
 The Rehearsal (Season 1) – Directed by Nathan Fielder
|-
! width="50%" | Audience Choice Prize
! width="50%" | The Unforgettables
|-
|valign="top"|
 Navalny – Directed by Daniel Roher All That Breathes – Directed by Shaunak Sen
 The Balcony Movie – Directed by Paweł Łoziński
 Fire of Love – Directed by Sara Dosa
 Last Flight Home – Directed by Ondi Timoner
 Mija – Directed by Isabel Castro
 My Old School – Directed by Jono McLeod
 Nothing Compares – Directed by Kathryn Ferguson
 "Sr." – Directed by Chris Smith
 The Territory – Directed by Alex Pritz
|valign="top"|
 All That Breathes – Mohammad Saud and Nadeem Shehzad All the Beauty and the Bloodshed – Nan Goldin Bad Axe – Chun Siev Beba – Rebeca Huntt Fire of Love – Katia and Maurice Krafft Gabby Giffords Won't Back Down – Gabby Giffords I Didn't See You There – Reid Davenport In Her Hands – Zarifa Ghafari Last Flight Home – Eli Timoner Mija – Doris Muñoz My Old School – Brandon Lee Navalny – Alexei Navalny Nothing Compares – Sinead O'Connor "Sr." – Robert Downey Sr. The Territory – Bitaté Uru-eu-wau-wau and Neidinha Bandeira|-
|}

Broadcast
{| class="wikitable" style="width:100%"
|- 
! width="50%" | Outstanding Broadcast Film
! width="50%" | Outstanding Nonfiction Series
|-
|valign="top"|
 Chernobyl: The Lost Tapes – Directed by James Jones (HBO Documentary Films/HBO Max) Downfall: The Case Against Boeing – Directed by Rory Kennedy (Netflix)
 Four Hours at the Capitol – Directed by Jamie Roberts (HBO Documentary Films/HBO Max)
 George Carlin's American Dream – Directed by Judd Apatow and Michael Bonfiglio (HBO Documentary Films/HBO Max)
 Playing With Sharks – Directed by Sally Aitken (Disney+)
|valign="top"|
 Black and Missing – Directed by Geeta Gandbhir and Samantha Knowles (HBO Documentary Films/HBO Max) The Beatles: Get Back – Directed by Peter Jackson (Disney+)
 Keep Sweet: Pray and Obey – Directed by Rachel Dretzin (Netflix)
 LuLaRich – Directed by Julia Willoughby Nason and Jenner Furst (Amazon Studios)
 Mind Over Murder – Directed by Nanfu Wang (HBO Documentary Films/HBO Max)
 We Need to Talk About Cosby – Directed by W. Kamau Bell (Showtime)
|-
! width="50%" | Outstanding Anthology Series
! width="50%" | Shorts List (Cinema Eye's Annual List of the Year's Top Short Documentaries)
|-
|valign="top"|
 How To with John Wilson – Nathan Fielder, Michael Koman, Clark Reinking and John Wilson, Executive Producers (HBO) Origins of Hip Hop – Peter Bittenbender, Mark Grande, Slane Hatch; Supervising Producers: Amira Lewally and Phoenix Skye Maulella, Executive Producers (A&E)
 Prehistoric Planet – Jon Favreau and Mike Gunton, Executive Producers; Tim Walker, Series Producer (Apple TV+)
 Stanley Tucci: Searching for Italy – Tom Barry, Adam Hawkins, Eve Kay and Stanley Tucci, Executive Producers; Robin O'Sullivan, Series Producer (CNN)
 Women Who Rock – Jessica Hopper, Rachel Brill, John Varvatos, Derik Murray and Jesse James Miller, Executive Producers (EPIX)
 The World According to Jeff Goldblum – Jeff Goldblum, Jane Root, Sara Brailsford, Keith Addis and Arif Nurmohamed, Executive Producers, Ben Jessop, Series Producer (Disney+)
|valign="top"|
 Anastasia – Directed by Sarah McCarthy                                              
 The Dreamlife of Georgie Stone – Directed by Maya Newell           
 The Joys and Sorrows of Young Yuguo – Directed by Ilinca Călugăreanu                                               
 Keys to the City – Directed by Ian Moubayed               
 In Flow of Words – Directed by Eliane Esther Bots                                    
 Last Days of August – Directed by Robert Machoian and Rodrigo Ojeda-Beck  
 Long Line of Ladies – Directed by Rayka Zehtabchi and Shaandiin Tome
 The Martha Mitchell Effect – Directed by Anne Alvergue and Debra McClutchy
 Nuisance Bear – Directed by Jack Weisman and Gabriela Osio Vanden
 Shut Up and Paint – Directed by Alex Mallis and Titus Kaphar
|-
! width="50%" | Outstanding Broadcast Editing
! width="50%" | Outstanding Broadcast Cinematography
|-
|valign="top"|
 We Need to Talk About Cosby – Meg Ramsay (Showtime) 37 Words – Jessica Congdon and Dave Marcus (ESPN)
 The Beatles: Get Back – Jabeez Olssen (Disney+)
 Four Hours at the Capitol – Will Grayburn (HBO Documentary Films/HBO Max)
 How to Survive a Pandemic – Adam Evans and Tyler H. Walk (HBO Documentary Films/HBO Max)
 How To with John Wilson – Adam Locke-Norton (HBO)
|valign="top"|
 Playing With Sharks – Michael Taylor, Judd Overton, Nathan Barlow and Toby Ralph (Disney+) Four Hours at the Capitol – Jamie Roberts (HBO Documentary Films/HBO Max)
 jeen-yuhs: A Kanye Trilogy – Coodie Simmons and Danny "DNA" Sorge (Netflix)
 Stanley Tucci: Searching for Italy – Andrew Muggleton (CNN)
 Tony Hawk: Until the Wheels Come Off – Sam Jones and Jesse Green (HBO Documentary Films/HBO Max)
|-
|}

Legacy Awards
 Crumb'' – Directed by Terry Zwigoff; Produced by Lynn O'Donnell and Terry Zwigoff; Edited by Victor Livingston; Cinematography by Maryse Alberti; Music by David Beddinghaus; Sound by Scott Breindell

References

External links
 Official website

Cinema Eye
2022 television awards